Cristoforo Roncalli (c. 1552–1626) was an Italian mannerist painter. He was one of the three painters known as Pomarancio or Il Pomarancio.

Life
Roncalli was born in Pomarance, a town near Volterra. His training occurred in Tuscany, and around 1578, he relocated to Rome, Italy where he worked for Niccolò Circignani (also known as  il Pomarancio).

Most of his fresco work was in Rome, though he worked for a decade in Loreto (1605–1615), where he decorated the New Sacristy.  In Rome he decorated the cupola of the church of Santa Maria di Loreto and of San Silvestro in Capite. He helped decorate Santa Maria in Vallicella for the Oratory of San Filippo Neri. He also painted for the Oratory of Santissimo Crocifisso, the Baptism of Constantine and St. Simon in the transept of San Giovanni in Laterano, and designed the mosaics in the Cappella Clementina in the St. Peter's Basilica. One of his pupils from Siena was Alessandro Casolano, and his son Ilario Casolano.

Roncalli was named a Cavaliere of Christ in 1607. He died in Rome in 1626.

Works
Madonna and Child with Saints Anthony and Agatha (1576), Museo del Duomo, Siena
Frescoes at Palazzo Agostini (1576), Siena
Life of St Francis de Paula (c. 1579-84), Trinità dei Monti, Rome
Metamorphoses, Palazzo Bindi, Siena
Ciclo degli avvenimenti della confraternita del Crocefisso (1583 - 1584), San Marcello al Corso church
Passion of Christ, (1585 - 1590) Rome, Santa Maria in Aracoeli, Rome
Life of St Paul (1585 - 1590) Santa Maria in Aracoeli, Rome
Life of St Philip of Neri (1596 - 1599), Santa Maria in Vallicella, Rome
St Domitilla with Saints Nereus and Achilles (1599), Santi Nereo e Achilleo, Rome
Baptism of Constantine the Great (1600), San Giovanni in Laterano, Rome
Eterno Benedicente, Chapel of the Sacraments, San Giovanni in Laterano, Rome
St Simon (1599), Santa Maria della Scala, Rome
Madonna with Child Jesus blessing  123 x 97 cm, 1600 circa, Galleria Nazionale delle Marche, Urbino
Madonna and Child, St Augustine, St Mary Magdalen and Angels 253 x 166 cm, 1610-1615, Brera Gallery, Milan
The Presentation of the Temple, Recanati, San Vito church
Saints Clare and Margaret of Cortona, attributed, Cappuccini Church, Recanati
Frescoes at Basilica della Santa Casa, Loreto 
Life of the Virgin, (1606-1610) Treasure Hall (Sala del Tesoro), Basilica della Santa Casa, Loreto
Ceiling of Palazzo Gallo, Osimo, Palazzo Gallo.
St Joseph frees souls from Purgatory, (attributed) Potenza Picena, communal gallery
Crucifixion, Potenza Picena, communal gallery
Madonna della Misericordia, Chiesa della Misericordia, San Severino Marche
Madonna del Carmelo, (attributed)  communal gallery, Corridonia
Enthroned Madonna with Child and Saints (1595) (communal gallery) Mapello (BG), Carvisi-Cabanetti with Oratorio Maria Annunziata
Santi Nursini, (early 17th-century) Norcia, Concattedrale di Santa Maria Argentea
Portrait of Cardinal Antonio Maria Gallo, private collection

References

Bibliography
"Macerata e il suo territorio: la Pittura" by Giuseppe Vitalini Sacconi
Romano Cordella, "Norcia e territorio" (Norcia and the Surrounding Area).

External links

Orazio and Artemisia Gentileschi, a fully digitized exhibition catalog from The Metropolitan Museum of Art Libraries, which contains material on Cristoforo Roncalli (see index)
Pomarancio
Cristoforo Roncalli on Artcyclopedia

1550s births
1626 deaths
People from Pomarance
16th-century Italian painters
Italian male painters
17th-century Italian painters
Italian Mannerist painters